"Driven" is a song by Canadian rock band Rush from their 1996 album Test for Echo. It was the third of five singles released from the album and reached No. 3 on the US Mainstream Rock chart.

Lead singer and bassist Geddy Lee said about the song:'Driven' is just from a bass player’s point of view. I wrote that song with three tracks of bass. I brought it to Alex and said, 'Here’s the song; I did three tracks of bass, but I just did that to fill in for the guitar', and he said, 'Let’s keep it with the three basses.' So, I said, 'I love you.'

Live performances
When played live, the song often includes a bass solo by Geddy Lee, as heard on the live albums Different Stages and Rush in Rio. The song has been played live by Rush 135 times.

Track listing

See also
List of songs recorded by Rush

References

1996 songs
1997 singles
Rush (band) songs
Songs written by Alex Lifeson
Songs written by Geddy Lee
Songs written by Neil Peart
Song recordings produced by Peter Collins (record producer)
Heavy metal songs